The Second Executive (8 May 2007 – 16 May 2011) is as under the terms of the Northern Ireland Act 1998 a power sharing coalition.

Devolution was restored to Northern Ireland on 8 May 2007 following the St Andrews Agreement, the March election saw the Democratic Unionist Party and Sinn Féin emerge as the largest parties in the Assembly.

2nd Executive of Northern Ireland

Junior Ministers

See also 
List of Northern Ireland Executives
Members of the Northern Ireland Assembly elected in 2007

Northern Ireland Executive
Northern Ireland, Executive of the Northern Ireland Assembly 3rd
Ministries of the Northern Ireland Assembly
2007 establishments in Northern Ireland
Cabinets established in 2007
2011 disestablishments in Northern Ireland
Cabinets disestablished in 2011
Ministries of Elizabeth II